Madeira City School District is a school district in Madeira, Ohio, a suburb of Cincinnati. It includes:

Schools 

Madeira Elementary School
Madeira Middle School
Madeira High School

References

External links
Madeira City Schools

Education in Hamilton County, Ohio
School districts in Ohio